False sunflower is a common name for several plants and may refer to:

Heliopsis, especially:
Heliopsis helianthoides, native to eastern and central North America
Phoebanthus